Bethayres station is a SEPTA Regional Rail station in Bethayres, Pennsylvania. It is located at Station Avenue and Old Welsh Road and serves the West Trenton Line to Ewing, New Jersey. Bethayres station was originally built in 1876 by the Reading Railroad. The station has off-street parking and a ticket office. There is also a handicapped-accessible platform. In FY 2013, Bethyares station had a weekday average of 578 boardings and 553 alightings. Bethayres is the last boarding stop for AM peak service express trains to Philadelphia and the first discharge stop for PM peak service express trains from Philadelphia.

Station layout
Bethayres has two low-level side platforms with a mini high-level platform.

References

External links

SEPTA – Bethayres Station
 Station from Huntingdon Pike from Google Maps Street View

SEPTA Regional Rail stations
Former Reading Company stations
Railway stations in Montgomery County, Pennsylvania